The following highways are numbered 768:

United States